The 2001 Laurence Olivier Awards were presented by the Society of London Theatre in 2001 at the Lyceum Theatre, London, celebrating excellence in West End theatre.

Winners and nominees
Details of winners (in bold) and nominees, in each award category, per the Society of London Theatre.

Productions with multiple nominations and awards
The following 22 productions, including one ballet and two operas, received multiple nominations:

 6: All My Sons
 5: The Witches of Eastwick
 4: Merrily We Roll Along, Singin' in the Rain, The Beautiful Game and The King and I
 3: Blue/Orange, Fosse, Stones in His Pockets, The Caretaker and The Pirates of Penzance
 2: Dolly West's Kitchen, Hamlet, Life x 3, Mozartina, My Zinc Bed, Orpheus Descending, Pageant, Passion Play, The Cherry Orchard, The Greek Passion and The Silver Tassie

The following three productions received multiple awards:

 4: All My Sons
 3: Merrily We Roll Along
 2: Stones in His Pockets

See also
 55th Tony Awards

References

External links
 Olivier Winners 2001

Laurence Olivier Awards ceremonies
Laurence Olivier Awards, 2001
2001 in London
Laur